Gownjuk-e Sofla (also Romanized as Gownjūk-e Soflá; also known as Dar Ganjak, Dar Ganjak-e Pā’īn, Dar Gonjak-i-Pāīn, Dar Goujak, Gavanjūk-e Pā’īn, and Gavanjūk Soflá) is a village in Piveh Zhan Rural District, Ahmadabad District, Mashhad County, Razavi Khorasan Province, Iran. At the 2006 census, its population was 71, in 21 families.

References 

Populated places in Mashhad County